Honest Thief is a 2020 American action thriller film directed by Mark Williams, from a screenplay by Williams and Steve Allrich. The film stars Liam Neeson, Kate Walsh, Jai Courtney, Jeffrey Donovan, Anthony Ramos and Robert Patrick, and follows a brooding former bank robber (Liam Neeson) who decides to turn himself in to the FBI, only to be set up by corrupt agents.

Honest Thief was theatrically released, including in IMAX, in the United States on October 16, 2020, by Open Road Films and Briarcliff Entertainment. The film received mixed reviews from critics, who praised Neeson's performance, but noted the film's familiarity.

Plot
Tom Dolan, a former US Marine and demolitions expert, has become a successful bank robber nicknamed the "In-and-Out Bandit". One day, while storing his money in a storage unit, he meets Annie Wilkins, a psychology graduate student working at the facility.

A year later, Tom is in a relationship with Annie and decides to turn himself and the money in to the FBI in exchange for a short sentence to put his criminal past behind him. FBI Agent Sam Baker dismisses him, having received false confessions in the past, and sends subordinates John Nivens and Ramon Hall to interview him. Tom directs them to the storage unit where his money is kept but Nivens convinces Hall to take the money for themselves. Nivens and Hall confront Tom at gunpoint at his hotel and learn he has two-thirds of the money hidden elsewhere as a bargaining chip. When Baker unexpectedly arrives, Nivens murders him while Tom flees with Annie.

Tom tells Annie everything and asks her to leave. However, she returns to the storage unit to get security camera footage of Nivens and Hall stealing the money. Nivens and Hall show up and Nivens knocks Annie unconscious before the pair escape with the footage. Tom finds Annie and races her to the hospital. Baker's partner, Sean Meyers, attempts to arrest Tom, but Tom escapes while telling Meyers what really happened. Meyers begins seeing discrepancies in Nivens' story.

Tom ambushes Hall in his home and convinces him to give up the security footage and the location of the safe house where the two stored the stolen money. Tom gets Annie out of the hospital, and Annie gives Meyers the security footage. She also leads him to the rest of the money. After Tom blows up Nivens' house with a bomb, Nivens flees to the safe house and finds Tom and Hall there. When Nivens discovers Hall turned over the security footage, he murders him in a rage, wounds Tom, and escapes. Anticipating his actions, Tom activates a bomb he placed in Nivens' car, forcing him to call in a bomb squad to disarm it. Meyers has Nivens arrested and recovers the stolen money from his car. It’s revealed that the car bomb was a harmless dud and that Hall was wearing a wire with which he caught Nivens' confession to Baker's murder as well as Nivens' murder of Hall.

With his name cleared of the murder charges, Tom turns himself in, and Meyers promises to try to get him a lighter sentence. Meyers expresses his respect for Tom's actions in both taking down Nivens and turning himself in for Annie, suggesting that in other circumstances, Tom would make a good FBI agent.

Cast
 Liam Neeson as Tom Dolan, an aging thief known as the "In-and-Out Bandit".
 Kate Walsh as Annie Wilkins, Tom's love interest.
 Jai Courtney as Agent John Nivens, a corrupt FBI agent.
 Jeffrey Donovan as Agent Sean Meyers
 Anthony Ramos as Agent Ramon Hall, a principled FBI agent and John's partner.
 Robert Patrick as Agent Sam Baker
 Jasmine Cephas Jones as Beth Hall

Production
On October 12, 2018, it was announced that Liam Neeson and Kate Walsh would star in the thriller film Honest Thief, as bank robber Tom and his love interest Annie, respectively, with Mark Williams directing. Jai Courtney and Jeffrey Donovan were also in talks for roles, with Tai Duncan, Myles Nestel, Williams, and Craig Chapman producing the film. Courtney and Donovan were later confirmed along with Anthony Ramos, and Robert Patrick added to the cast in November, with filming set to begin on November 5. The film was set in Boston, and shot in and around Worcester, Massachusetts.

Release
In January 2020, Briarcliff Entertainment acquired distribution rights to the film and set it for a September 4, 2020 release. It was then re-scheduled to be released on October 9, 2020. In June 2020, it was announced Open Road Films would co-distribute the film with Briarcliff. After temporarily being pulled from the schedule due to the COVID-19 pandemic, the film's ultimate U.S. release date was October 16, 2020. Due to the lack of big-budget competition, the film also played in IMAX and Dolby theaters.

Reception

Box office 
Honest Thief has grossed $14.2 million in the United States and Canada, and $15.9 million in other territories, for a worldwide total of $30.1 million.

In the United States, the film grossed $1.3 million from 2,425 theaters on its first day, including $225,000 from Thursday night preview screenings. It went on to debut to $3.6 million, or $4.1 million including Canada's opening weekend the previous week, topping the box office. In its second weekend the film made $2.4 million, remaining in first, before being dethroned by newcomer Come Play in its third weekend.

Critical response 
The website's critics consensus reads, "Guilty of first-degree squandering, Honest Thief returns Liam Neeson to late-period action thriller mode but neglects to supply much of a story." On Metacritic, it has a weighted average score of 46 out of 100, based on 21 critics, indicating "mixed or average reviews". According to PostTrak, 75% of audience members gave the film a positive score, with 53% saying they would definitely recommend it.

Owen Gleiberman of Variety complimented Neeson for not phoning in his performance, but added, "Honest Thief isn't incompetent (for a certain kind of pulp action fan, it delivers just enough of the goods), but it's a textbook case of an action movie that goes through the motions." Frank Scheck for The Hollywood Reporter said the film "delivers exactly what you expect" and wrote, "Running a sleek 90 minutes before the credits roll, Honest Thief is certainly efficient if not exactly original, with writer/director Williams infusing it with enough quirky character touches — such as Tom crankily complaining how much he hates his 'In and Out Bandit' moniker — to distract from the derivative feeling of it all."

References

External links
 

2020 films
2020 action thriller films
2020s heist films
American action thriller films
American heist films
Films about bank robbery
Films about the Federal Bureau of Investigation
Films about police misconduct
Films postponed due to the COVID-19 pandemic
Films scored by Mark Isham
Films set in Boston
Films shot in Massachusetts
Open Road Films films
IMAX films
2020s English-language films
2020s American films